Dalal Abdel Aziz (17 January 1960 – 7 August 2021) was an Egyptian actress. She was the wife of actor Samir Ghanem from 1984 until her death in 2021.

Education
Abdel Aziz had her bachelor's degree from the Faculty of Agriculture at Zagazig University. She later studied at the Faculty of Mass Communication, English Literature and Political Science in the Cairo University.

Career
Abdel Aziz entered the field of acting in 1977 with some small roles, including her role in the series "Bint Al Ayam", and her actual beginning was when artist Nour El Demerdash introduced her to theater, and she participated in many series, plays and films, such as “Five-Star Thieves” (1994) with Salah Zulfikar, and with these works she was able to obtain many awards as the best actress.

Personal life
Abdel Aziz was married to actor Samir Ghanem; they were the parents of actresses Donia and Amy.

Ghanem died from complications of kidney functions and associated mucormycosis related to COVID-19 in El Safa Hospital, Mohandiseen, Giza on 20 May 2021, at the age of 84.

Abdel Aziz herself died on 7 August, from complications related to COVID-19 100 days after infection.

References

External links

1960 births
2021 deaths
People from Sharqia Governorate
Zagazig University alumni
Cairo University alumni
Egyptian film actresses
Egyptian stage actresses
Egyptian television actresses
Deaths from the COVID-19 pandemic in Egypt
20th-century Egyptian actresses
21st-century Egyptian actresses